Huddersfield Town's 1963–64 campaign was mainly a season of nothingness for the Town. They finished 12th in Division 2. Their only main high point of the season was reaching the 5th round of the FA Cup, before losing to Burnley.

Squad at the start of the season

Review
Following the previous season's impressive performances and the acquisition of Kevin Lewis from Liverpool, many thought that Town's chances of promotion back to Division 1 for the first time since 1956. The town mainly won or lost their first 16 league games of the season. The form was inconsistent throughout a large portion of the season. Only during the second half of the season did Town's form start to stabilise, but it improved enough for Town not to be involved in a relegation dogfight to Division 3. They finished in 12th place with 40 points. The main high points of the season came in the FA Cup, when they beat Plymouth Argyle (one of 6 times Town met Argyle during the season), followed by an amazing win at Stamford Bridge over Division 1 Chelsea, before bowing out to Burnley at Turf Moor.

Squad at the end of the season

Results

Division Two

FA Cup

Football League Cup

Appearances and goals

1963-64
English football clubs 1963–64 season